Grid is South Korean streaming television series starring Seo Kang-joon, Kim Ah-joong, Kim Mu-yeol, Kim Sung-kyun, and Lee Si-young. It premiered on Disney+ on February 16, 2022, for Asia-pacific subscribers.

Synopsis 
A mystery tracking thriller of the General Affairs Bureau and detectives digging into the truth about the mysterious existence that saved mankind in crisis.

Cast

Main 
 Seo Kang-joon as Kim Sae-ha / Kwon Sae-ha, an employee of the Grid Bureau
Choi Seung-hoon as young Sae-ha
 Kim Ah-joong as Jung Sae-byeok, a detective
 Kim Mu-yeol as Song Eo-jin, an employee of the Grid Bureau
 Kim Sung-kyun as Kim Ma-nok / Lee Si-won, a murderer
 Lee Si-young as the ghost the founder of the Grid

Supporting 
 Jang So-yeon as Choi Sun-wool, the Deputy Director of the Grid Bureau
 Song Sang-eun as Chae Jong-i, an employee of the Grid Bureau
 Lee Kyu-hoe as Han Wi-han, the chief security officer of the Grid Bureau
 Jung Won-joong as the minister of Ministry of Commerce Industry and Energy
 Kim Hyung-mook as Jo Heung-sik, the Director of the Grid Bureau
 Kwon Hyuk as a department heads of the Grid Bureau
 Heo Joon-suk as Major Im Ji-woo,the captain of the Special Squad of the Grid Bureau
 Kong Sang-a as Kim Min-seon, Sae-ha's mother
 Jo Hee-bong as Ko Han-seung, Sae-byeok's superior
 Cha Sun-woo as Jung Him-chan, Sae-byeok's younger brother
 Lee Seung-cheol as Lee Jang-hyuk, Si-won's foster father who killed by the ghost

Special appearance
 Lee Hae-young as Kwon Soo-geun, Sae-ha's father, killed by the ghost
 Seo Kang-joon as younger Soo-geun
 Kim Kwak-kyung-hee as Subway cleaner
 Yoo Jae-myung as Unknown person
 Ki Hong Lee as Man from the future

Production 
The series is directed by Khan Lee, director of films such as Desert Dream (2007), and written by Lee Soo-eun, who wrote the series Life (2018) and the famous legal drama Stranger. It is produced by Ace Factory, Arc Media, and an original series for the Disney Streaming platform including Disney+'s Star Hub and Hulu.

References

External links 
 
 
 

2022 South Korean television series debuts
2022 South Korean television series endings
Star (Disney+) original programming
South Korean crime television series
South Korean drama web series
South Korean mystery television series
South Korean science fiction television series
South Korean web series
South Korean thriller television series
South Korean pre-produced television series